Brian Byrne (born 16 November 1984 in Kilkenny) is an Irish professional squash player. As of March 2018, he was ranked number 149 in the world. He has competed in the main draw of multiple professional PSA tournaments. As of March 2018, he is the highest internationally ranked player in Ireland.

References

1984 births
Living people
Irish male squash players